Flornes is a village in the municipality of Stjørdal in Trøndelag county, Norway. The village of Sona lies to the west and the village of Gudå (in Meråker municipality) lies to the east.

The village is the location of Floren Chapel.  The Meråkerbanen railway line used to stop here at Flornes Station, and the European route E14 highway also runs through the village.

References

Villages in Trøndelag
Stjørdal